Keith Miller is a fictional character from the BBC soap opera EastEnders, played by David Spinx. He made his first appearance on September 6, 2004. It was announced on February 25, 2008 that the characters of Keith and Mickey had been axed by EastEnders' Executive Producer Diederick Santer. He left the show on 1 July 2008.

Storylines
Keith arrives with his partner, Rosie (Gerry Cowper), their twins, Darren (Charlie G. Hawkins) and Demi (Shana Swash), and the family dog, Genghis, joining Rosie's son, Mickey (Joe Swash) and moving into 27 Albert Square. They are later joined by Demi's newborn baby, Aleesha (Freya Coltman-West), Rosie's daughter, Dawn Swann (Kara Tointon), and Dawn's daughter, Summer Swann. Keith, who does not work and spends his time watching documentaries on television, has his incapacity benefits stopped when Stacey Slater (Lacey Turner) catches him on CCTV moving heavy boxes and reports him for benefit fraud. However, he remains unemployed, and it is revealed that he is illiterate, but, his family encouraged him to learn to read and write. Rosie drops several hints that she wants Keith to propose, but he eventually leaves her when he discovers that she plans to leave him for her ex-husband, Mike Swann (Mark Wingett), and he moves in with Garry Hobbs (Ricky Groves) and Minty Peterson (Cliff Parisi). He later forgives Rosie when she begs for another chance and moves back in with her. Mike moves out, but, leaves a message for Dawn on the Millers' answering machine. Keith deletes the message, as he does not want Mike to have anything to do with the family. Mike's mother, Nora Swann (Pamela Cundell), later dies in hospital and they have no way of contacting Mike to let him know. Rosie kicks Keith out and he moves in with Gus (Mohammed George) and Juley Smith (Joseph Kpobie). Keith desperately wants Rosie back and knows that the only thing he can offer her is marriage. He proposes and they get back together, but, Keith tries to delay the wedding, as he is not really interested in getting married. He later realizes that nothing will really change after they get married and soon changes his mind.

Rosie does not want to put off the wedding any longer and the ceremony takes place at Walford Register Office. Keith arrives late with mud on his suit, but, Rosie cannot go through with the wedding and jilts Keith halfway through the ceremony. Keith decides to change his ways and help more around the house. However, this does not change Rosie's mind. She tells Keith she is no longer in love with him, and is taking a job in the Cotswolds, and taking Darren, Demi and Aleesha with her. She prepares to leave but Darren does not want to go, so Rosie convinces Keith to make Darren leave by saying he is not interested in his son. However, Darren is upset and decides to go, and when Rosie sees how upset he is, she allows him to stay, revealing that Keith was lying. Keith wins on the lottery but loses the ticket. The next day Dawn, Mickey and Darren are furious at him so he agrees to try to get a job. However, he changes his mind, but lies to Dawn; when she, Mickey and Darren discover the lie, they throw him out of the house, even though he has found a job as a road sweeper. He moves in with Masood Ahmed (Nitin Ganatra), who owes him a favor. May Wright (Amanda Drew) sets the Millers' house on fire after her attempts to kidnap Summer. Keith was supposed to be on the lookout for May but was revising for a pub quiz in The Queen Victoria. Wracked with guilt, he goes into the burning building and rescues Dawn. Mickey discovers a letter from Rosie offering Keith a job working as a concierge at the hotel she was working at in the Cotswolds.  Keith, however, has kept this letter hidden from his family for over a month. Angry that he has not followed up to contact Rosie about the job, Mickey applies for the job instead. Keith admits to Dawn that he still loves Rosie but cannot take the risk accepting the job and being rejected by her. As Mickey is set to leave, a newly groomed Keith, along with Genghis, tells Mickey he has decided to accept the job after all and that he is coming with him. They leave for the Cotswolds, leaving Darren, Dawn and Summer in Walford. Dawn later reveals that Keith and Rosie have reconciled.

References

External links

EastEnders characters
Television characters introduced in 2004
Fictional fraudsters
Male characters in television
Fictional unemployed people